Arizona Frontier is a 1940 American Western film directed by Albert Herman and written by Robert Emmett Tansey. The film stars Tex Ritter, Slim Andrews, Evelyn Finley, Frank LaRue, Tris Coffin and Gene Alsace. The film was released on August 19, 1940, by Monogram Pictures.

Plot

Cast         
 Tex Ritter as Tex Whitedeer
 Slim Andrews as Slim Chance
 Evelyn Finley as Honey Lane
 Frank LaRue as Captain Farley
 Tris Coffin as Lt. James
 Gene Alsace as Bisbee
 Richard Cramer as Graham 
 James Pierce as Kansas 
 Jim Thorpe as Gray Cloud
 Hal Price as Joe Lane
 James Sheridan as Henchman
 Chick Hannan as Henchman
 Art Wilcox as Art Wilcox

References

External links
 

1940 films
1940 Western (genre) films
American Western (genre) films
American black-and-white films
Films directed by Albert Herman
Monogram Pictures films
1940s English-language films
1940s American films